Valparaíso is a city in Chile.

Valparaiso may also refer to:

Places

Brazil
Valparaíso, São Paulo
Valparaíso de Goiás

Canada
Valparaiso, Saskatchewan

Chile
Valparaíso Region
Valparaíso Province
Greater Valparaíso

Colombia
Valparaíso, Antioquia
Valparaíso, Caquetá

Mexico
Valparaíso, Zacatecas

Spain
Valparaíso de Arriba, Cuenca
Historic name for the district of Sacromonte, Granada

United States
Valparaiso, Florida
Valparaiso, Indiana
Valparaiso Collegiate Institute
Valparaiso High School
Valparaiso University
Valparaiso Beacons, this university's athletic program
Valparaiso University School of Law, the university's now-defunct law school
Valparaiso, Nebraska

Other uses
Valparaiso (play), a stage play by Don DeLillo that was first performed in 1999
"Valparaiso", a 1996 song by Sting from Mercury Falling
"Valparaiso", a 1998 song by Anggun from La Neige au Sahara (1998)
Valparaiso Moraine is a geographic feature from the Wisconsin Glaciation, 14,000 years before present
Battle of Valaparaiso in the War of 1812

See also
Valpo (disambiguation)